The 2010 Norwegian Figure Skating Championships was held in Oslo from January 15 to 17, 2010. Skaters competed in the discipline of single skating. The results were used to choose the teams to the 2010 World Championships, the 2010 European Championships, the 2010 Nordic Championships, and the 2010 World Junior Championships.

Senior results

Ladies

External links
 results

Norwegian Figure Skating Championships
Norwegian Figure Skating Championships, 2010
2010 in Norwegian sport